Rekha Hande was crowned Miss India in 1983. She also won Miss Karnataka, Miss Bangalore and several other titles such as Spring Queen, Pond's Queen, May Queen etc. She was the Eve's Weekly First Runner-up.

With the gained popularity after winning the Miss India Pageant she pursued careers in modelling and the film industry. She currently works in the beauty business and with charity organisations.

References

External links
 Femina Miss India
 Miss Universe 1983

Year of birth missing (living people)
Living people
Indian beauty pageant winners
Miss Universe 1983 contestants